MSC Musica is the first  built in 2006 and operated by MSC Cruises. The vessel has 1,268 passenger cabins which can accommodate 2,550 passengers double occupancy, served by approximately 987 crew members.

History

COVID-19 pandemic
On 9 April 2020,  reported that a 32-year-old Indian crew member of MSC Musica had tested positive for COVID-19. The crew member was initially admitted to hospital for emergency care due to anemia and had tested negative for the virus upon admission. However, when the crew member was scheduled for discharge, another test was performed, which returned positive. It is unclear if the virus was contracted aboard the ship or after disembarkation, but MSC Musica, which had been moored at the Port of Santos, was placed under quarantine as a preventative measure, with the standard 14 days of quarantine beginning on the day the crew member had disembarked.

References

External links

Official website
 

Musica
Ships built in France
2005 ships